is a former Japanese football player.

Playing career
Umezawa was born in Tokyo on August 29, 1972. He played for Yokohama Flügels. He played many matches as midfielder in 1992 J.League Cup. However Flügels finished at the 10th place of 10 clubs. He could not play at all in the match in 1993 and retired end of 1993 season.

Club statistics

References

External links

1972 births
Living people
Association football people from Tokyo
Japanese footballers
J1 League players
Yokohama Flügels players
Association football midfielders